Sri Sri Radha Krishna temple is one of the most important Hindu temples in South Korea. It belongs to the Vaishnavite ISKCON movement. The temple is located in the Uijeongbu city of Gyeonggi Province. It holds many lecture seminars and Yoga classes for Hindu devotees living in nearby areas.

See also
 Buddhism in Korea
 Hinduism in Korea
 Indians in Korea
 Koreans in India
 Korean Shamanism
 Memorial of Heo Hwang-ok, Ayodhya 
 India–South Korea relations
 India – North Korea relations
 List of Hindu temples in South Korea
 List of Hindu temples outside India
 Silk Road transmission of Buddhism

References

Hindu temples in South Korea